ESSA-8 was a weather satellite launched by the National Aeronautics and Space Administration (NASA) on December 15, 1968, from Vandenberg Air Force Base, California. Its name was derived from that of its oversight agency, the Environmental Science Services Administration (ESSA).

ESSA-8 was an 18-sided polygon. It was made of aluminum alloy and stainless steel covered with 10,020 solar cells. The cells charged 63 nickel–cadmium batteries, which served as a power source. The satellite could take 8 to 10 pictures every 24 hours.

ESSA-8's mission was to replace ESSA-6, and provide detailed cloud pattern photography to ground stations worldwide.  Partners in the project included NASA, ESSA, RCA, the National Weather Service, and the National Centers for Environmental Prediction (NMC).

ESSA-8 operated for 2,644 days until it was deactivated on March 12, 1976.

References

External links

http://www.earth.nasa.gov/history/essa/essa8.html
https://web.archive.org/web/20060902131201/http://www.met.fsu.edu/explores/Guide/Essa_Html/essa8.html

Spacecraft launched in 1968
Meteorological instrumentation and equipment
Weather satellites of the United States